Grakcu Sai Mai United Football Club (Thai สโมสรฟุตบอลเกร็กคู สายไหม ยูไนเต็ด) is a Thailand semi professional football club based in Sai Mai, Bangkok. The club is currently playing in the Thailand Amateur League Bangkok metropolitan region.

History

The club was formed in 2009 as Rose Asia Pathum Thani and entered the newly formed Regional League Central-East Division of which they came last only winning one game in their debut season, 1:0 at home to Rayong. During their debut season they also entered the 2009 Thai FA Cup and were knocked out in the Qualifying Round

In 2010, the club was moved by the Thai Football Association (FAT) into the Regional League Bangkok Area Division of which they again came 13th and therefore bottom once again. At the beginning of this new campaign, the club also changed their name to Rose Asia United Thanyaburi  forming closer links with the district of Thanyaburi which resides in Pathum Thani. During the 2010 campaign they also entered the 2010 Thai League Cup but lost in the Qualifying Round to league rivals Nakhon Sawan Rajabhat University. Rose Asia decided not to enter the 2010 Thai FA Cup.

At the beginning of the 2011 campaign, the club once again changed name to Thanyaburi United after being bought by a Korean national, dropping all ties with Rose Asia in the process.

In 2012, the club were taken over by Air Force United F.C. to be used as their feeder team. Their name was changed to Grakcu Looktabfah.

In 2018, The club change the name to Grakcu Sai Mai United F.C. due to change the ground to Grakcu United stadium that located on Sai Mai District in Bangkok.

Stadium and locations

Seasons

References

 http://www.siamsport.co.th/football/thaileague4/view/41178
 http://www.siamsport.co.th/football/thaileague4/view/41414

External links 
 Official Website of Grakcu Sai Mai United FC

Association football clubs established in 2009
Football clubs in Thailand
Pathum Thani province
2009 establishments in Thailand